Simón Bolívar University may refer to:

 Simón Bolívar University (Venezuela)
 Simón Bolívar University (Colombia)
 Simón Bolívar University (Mexico)